Traditional Ties is a third album by the progressive bluegrass band Hot Rize. It was the first Hot Rize album released by Sugar Hill Records, following the band's earlier releases with Flying fish records. Critic Thom Owens called the album "arguably their best effort ever".

The song "Walk the Way the Wind Blows", written by Tim O'Brien and included on Traditional Ties, was covered by country music artist Kathy Mattea. Her recording reached #10 on the Billboard Top 40 Country listing.

Track listing

 Hard Pressed (O'Brien) 2.36
 If I Should Wander Back Tonight (Flatt, Scruggs) 2:38
 Walk the Way the Wind Blows (O'Brien) 3:38
 Hear Jerusalem Moan (trad.) 2:54
 Frank's Blues (Edmonson, Wernick) 2:37
 John, Lost (trad.) 2:32
 Montana Cowboy (Park) 2:42
 Footsteps So Near (Forster, O'Brien) 4:09
 Leather Britches (trad.) 2:34
 Working on a Building (trad.) 3:29
 John Henry (trad.) 1:47
 Keep Your Lamp Trimmed and Burning (trad.) 2:46

Personnel
 Nick Forster - bass, vocals
 Tim O'Brien - vocals, mandolin, violin
 Pete Wernick - banjo, vocals
 Charles Sawtelle - guitar, vocals

References

External links
 Official site

1985 albums
Hot Rize albums